Memoirs is a 1984 drama film co-written and directed by Bashar Shbib based on the play The Memoirs Of Johnny Daze by John Becket Wimbs.

References 

1984 films
English-language Canadian films
Films directed by Bashar Shbib
1984 drama films
Canadian drama films
1980s English-language films
1980s Canadian films